Rick Leach and Jim Pugh were the defending champions, but lost in the third round this year.

Wayne Ferreira and Piet Norval won the title, defeating Ken Flach and Robert Seguso 5–7, 7–6, 6–2 in the final.

Seeds

Draw

Finals

Top half

Section 1

Section 2

Bottom half

Section 3

Section 4

References

 Main Draw

Men's Doubles
Men's Doubles